A direct-shift gearbox (DSG) is an electronically-controlled, dual-clutch, multiple-shaft, automatic gearbox, in either a transaxle or traditional transmission layout (depending on engine/drive configuration), with automated clutch operation, and with fully-automatic or semi-manual gear selection. The first dual-clutch transmissions were derived from Porsche in-house development for the Porsche 962 in the 1980s.

In simple terms, a DSG automates two separate "manual" gearboxes (and clutches) contained within one housing and working as one unit. It was designed by BorgWarner and is licensed to the Volkswagen Group, with support by IAV GmbH. By using two independent clutches, a DSG can achieve faster shift times and eliminates the torque converter of a conventional epicyclic automatic transmission.

Overview

Transverse DSG
At the time of launch in 2003, it became the world's first automated dual-clutch transmission in a series-production car, in the German-market Volkswagen Golf Mk4 R32, and shortly afterwards worldwide, in the original Audi TT 3.2. and the 2004+ New Beetle TDI. For the first few years of production, this original DSG transmission was only available in transversely oriented front-engine, front-wheel-drive and Haldex Traction-based four-wheel-drive vehicle layouts.

The first DSG transaxle that went into production for the Volkswagen Group mainstream marques had six forward speeds (and one reverse) and used wet/submerged multi-plate clutch packs (Volkswagen Group internal code: DQ250, parts code prefix: 02E). The two-wheel-drive version weighs . It is manufactured at Volkswagen Group's Kassel plant, with a daily production output of 1,500 units.

At the start of 2008, another world-first  seven-speed DSG transaxle (Volkswagen Group internal code: DQ200, parts code prefix: 0AM) became available. It differs from the six-speed DSG, in that it uses two single-plate dry clutches (of similar diameter). This clutch pack was designed by LuK Clutch Systems, Gmbh. This seven-speed DSG is used in smaller front-wheel-drive cars with smaller-displacement engines with lower torque outputs, such as the latest Volkswagen Golf, Volkswagen Polo Mk5, and the new SEAT Ibiza. It has considerably less oil capacity than the six-speed DQ250; this new DQ200 uses just  of transmission fluid.

Audi longitudinal DSG
In late 2008, an all-new seven-speed longitudinal S tronic version of the DSG transaxle went into series production (Volkswagen Group internal code: DL501, parts code prefix: 0B5). Initially, from early 2009, it is only used in certain Audi cars, and only with longitudinally mounted engines. Like the original six-speed DSG, it features a concentric dual wet multi-plate clutch. However, this particular variant uses notably more plates – the larger outer clutch (for the odd-numbered gears) uses 10 plates, whereas the smaller inner clutch (driving even-numbered gears and reverse) uses 12 plates. Another notable change over the original transverse DSGs is the lubrication system  – Audi now utilise two totally separate oil circuits. This dual circuit lubrication is aimed at increasing overall reliability, due to eliminating cross-contamination of debris and wear particles.

This was initially available in their quattro all-wheel-drive variants, and is very similar to the new ZF Friedrichshafen-supplied Porsche Doppel-Kupplung (PDK).

List of DSG variants

Operational introduction
The internal combustion engine drives two clutch packs. The outer clutch pack drives gears 1, 3, 5 (and 7 when fitted), and reverse – the outer clutch pack has a larger diameter compared to the inner clutch, and can therefore handle greater torque loadings. The inner clutch pack drives gears 2, 4, and 6. Instead of a standard large dry single-plate clutch, each clutch pack for the six-speed DSG is a collection of four small wet interleaved clutch plates (similar to a motorcycle wet multi-plate clutch). Due to space constraints, the two clutch assemblies are concentric, and the shafts within the gearbox are hollow and also concentric. Because the alternate clutch pack's gear-sets can be pre-selected (predictive shifts enabled via the unloaded section of the gearbox), un-powered time while shifting is avoided because the transmission of torque is simply switched from one clutch-pack to the other. While the DSG has one of the fastest shift times on the market, the claim that the DSG takes only about 8 milliseconds to upshift is un-proven with 3-party data nor claimed by the manufacturer.

The variant of DSG fitted to plug-in hybrid vehicles (such as the Golf/Passat GTE and the Audi A3 e-tron) also have a third clutch - its function is connect the electric motor to the combustion engine when both power sources are required simultaneously to propel the vehicle (the motor armature permanently turns with the input shaft of the transmission) - it also is engaged to bump start the combustion engine from the electric motor whenever the transmission is in the "N" position - this is due to the engine not having a conventional starter motor.

DSG controls
The direct-shift gearbox uses a floor-mounted transmission shift lever, very similar to that of a conventional automatic transmission. The lever is operated in a straight 'fore and aft' plane (without any 'dog-leg' offset movements), and uses an additional button to help prevent an inadvertent selection of an inappropriate shift lever position.

P 
P position of the floor-mounted gear shift lever means that the transmission is set in park.  Both clutch packs are fully disengaged, all gear-sets are disengaged, and a solid mechanical transmission lock is applied to the crown wheel of the DSG's internal differential.  This position must only be used when the motor vehicle is stationary.  Furthermore, this is the position which must be set on the shift lever before the vehicle ignition key can be removed.

N 
N position of the floor-mounted shift lever means that the transmission is in neutral. Similar to P above, both clutch packs and all gear-sets are fully disengaged; however, the parking lock is also disengaged.

D mode
Whilst the motor vehicle is stationary and in neutral (N), the driver can select D for drive (after first pressing the foot brake pedal). The transmission's outer clutch K2 engages at the start of the bite point, while on the alternate gear shaft the reverse gear clutch K1 is also selected. The clutch pack for second gear (K2) gets ready to engage. When the driver releases the brake pedal, the K2 clutch clamping force is increased, allowing the transmission to drive the wheels. Depressing the accelerator pedal engages the clutch and causes an increase of forward vehicle speed. Pressing the throttle pedal to the floor (hard acceleration) will cause the gearbox to "kick down" to first gear to provide the acceleration associated with first, although there will be a slight hesitation while the gearbox deselects second gear and selects first gear. As the vehicle accelerates, the transmission's computer determines when the second gear (which is connected to the second clutch) should be fully used. Depending on the vehicle speed and amount of engine power being requested by the driver (determined by the position of the throttle pedal), the DSG then up-shifts. During this sequence, the DSG disengages the first outer clutch whilst simultaneously engaging the second inner clutch (all power from the engine is now going through the second shaft), thus completing the shift sequence. This sequence in a fraction of a second (aided by pre-selection), and can be performed without lifting off the throttle, resulting in minimal power loss.

Once the vehicle has completed the shift to second gear, the first gear is immediately de-selected, and third gear is pre-selected. Once the time comes to shift into 3rd, the second clutch disengages and the first clutch re-engages. This sequence repeats through the gear changes.

Downshifting is similar to up-shifting but in reverse order. At 600 milliseconds downshifting is necessarily slower, due to the engine's Electronic Control Unit (ECU) needing to 'blip' the throttle so that the engine crankshaft speed can match the appropriate gear shaft speed. A downshift occurs when the ECU senses the car slowing down, or when more power is required.

The actual shift points are determined by the DSG's transmission ECU, which controls a hydro-mechanical unit. The transmission ECU, combined with the hydro-mechanical unit, are collectively called a mechatronics unit or module. Because the DSG's ECU uses fuzzy logic, the operation of the DSG is said to be adaptive; that is, the DSG will "learn" how the user drives the car, and will progressively tailor the shift points accordingly to suit the habits of the driver.

In the vehicle instrument display, between the speedometer and tachometer, the available shift-lever positions are shown, the current position of the shift-lever is highlighted (emboldened), and the current gear ratio in use is also displayed as a number.

Under "normal", progressive and linear acceleration and deceleration, the DSG shifts in a sequential manner; i.e., under acceleration: 1st → 2nd → 3rd → 4th → 5th → 6th, and the same sequence reversed for deceleration. However, the DSG can also skip the normal sequential method, by missing gears, and shift two or more gears. This is most apparent if the car is being driven at sedate speeds in one of the higher gears with a light throttle opening, and the accelerator pedal is then pressed down, engaging the kick-down function. During kick-down, the DSG will skip gears, shifting directly to the most appropriate gear depending on speed and throttle opening. This kick-down may be engaged by any increased accelerator pedal opening, and is completely independent of the additional resistance to be found when the pedal is pressed fully to the floor, which will activate a similar kick-down function when in Manual operation mode. The seven-speed unit in the 2007 Audi variants will not automatically shift to 6th gear; rather, it stays at 5th to keep power available at a high RPM while cruising.

When the floor-mounted gear selector lever is in position D, the DSG works in fully automatic mode, with emphasis placed on gear shifts programmed to deliver maximum fuel economy. That means that shifts will change up and down very early in the rev-range.

S mode 
The floor selector lever also has an S position. When S is selected, sport mode is activated in the DSG. Sport mode still functions as a fully automatic mode, identical in operation to D mode, but upshifts and downshifts are made much higher up the engine rev-range. This aids a more sporty driving manner, by utilising considerably more of the available engine power, and also maximising engine braking. However, this mode does have a detrimental effect on the vehicle fuel consumption, when compared to D mode. This mode may not be ideal to use when wanting to drive in a sedate manner; nor when road conditions are very slippery, due to ice, snow or torrential rain – because loss of tire traction may be experienced (wheel spin during acceleration, and may also result in road wheel locking during downshifts at high engine rpms under closed throttle). On 4motion or quattro-equipped vehicles this may be partially offset by the drivetrain maintaining full-time engagement of the rear differential in S mode, so power distribution under loss of front-wheel traction may be marginally improved.

S is highlighted in the instrument display, and like D mode, the currently used gear ratio is also displayed as a number.

R 
R position of the floor-mounted shift lever means that the transmission is in reverse.  This functions in a similar way to D, but there is just one reverse gear. When selected, R is highlighted in the instrument display.

Manual mode
Additionally, the floor shift lever also has another plane of operation, for manual mode, with spring-loaded + and − positions. This plane is selected by moving the stick away from the driver (in vehicles with the driver's seat on the right, the lever is pushed to the left, and in left-hand drive cars, the stick is pushed to the right) when in D mode only. When this plane is selected, the DSG can now be controlled like a manual gearbox, albeit only under a sequential shift pattern.

In most (VW) applications, the readout in the instrument display changes to 6 5 4 3 2 1, and just like the automatic modes, the currently used gear ratio is highlighted or emboldened. In other versions (e.g., on the Audi TT) the display shows just M followed by the gear currently selected; e.g., M1, M2, etc.

To change up a gear, the lever is pushed forward (against a spring pressure) towards the +, and to change down, the lever is pulled rearward towards the −. The DSG transmission can now be operated with the gear changes being (primarily) determined by the driver. This method of operation is commonly called tiptronic. In the interests of engine preservation, when accelerating in Manual/tiptronic mode, the DSG will still automatically change up just before the redline, and when decelerating, it will change down automatically at very low revs, just before the engine idle speed (tickover). Furthermore, if the driver calls for a gear when it is not appropriate (e.g., requesting a downshift when engine speed is near the redline) the DSG will not change to the driver's requested gear.

Current variants of the DSG will still downshift to the lowest possible gear ratio when the kick-down button is activated during full throttle whilst in manual mode. In Manual mode this kick-down is only activated by an additional button at the bottom of the accelerator pedal travel; unless this is pressed the DSG will not downshift, and will simply perform a full-throttle acceleration in whatever gear was previously being utilised.

Paddle shifters
Initially available on certain high-powered cars, and those with a "sporty" trim level—such as those using the 2.0 T FSI and 3.2/3.6 VR6 engines—steering wheel-mounted paddle shifters were available. However, these are now being offered (either as a standard inclusive fitment, or as a factory optional extra) on virtually all DSG-equipped cars, throughout all model ranges, including lesser power output applications, such as the 105 PS Volkswagen Golf Plus.

These operate in an identical manner as the floor mounted shift lever when it is placed across the gate in manual mode. The paddle shifters have two distinct advantages: the driver can safely keep both hands on the steering wheel when using the Manual/tiptronic mode; and the driver can temporarily manually override either of the automatic programmes (D or S), and gain instant manual control of the DSG transmission (within the above described constraints).

If the paddle-shift activated manual override of one of the automatic modes (D or S) is used intermittently the DSG transmission will default back to the previously selected automatic mode after a predetermined duration of inactivity of the paddles, or when the vehicle becomes stationary. Alternatively, should the driver wish to immediately revert to fully automatic control, this can be done by activating and holding the + paddle for at least two seconds.

Advantages and disadvantages

Advantages 
Better fuel economy (up to 15% improvement) than conventional planetary geared automatic transmission (due to lower parasitic losses from oil churning) and for some models with manual transmissions;
No loss of torque through the transmission from the engine to the driving wheels during up-shifts;
Short up-shift time when shifting to a gear the alternate gear shaft has preselected;
Smooth gear-shift operations;
Consistent down-shift time of 600 milliseconds, regardless of throttle or operational mode;

Disadvantages 
The clutch pack mechanisms have a limited lifespan;
Marginally worse mechanical efficiency compared to a conventional manual transmission, especially on wet-clutch variants due to electronics and hydraulic systems;
Expensive specialist transmission fluids/lubricants with dedicated additives are required, which need regular changes;
Relatively expensive to manufacture, and therefore increases new vehicle purchase price;
Relatively lengthy shift time when shifting to a gear ratio which the transmission control unit did not anticipate (around 1100 ms, depending on the situation);
Torque handling capability constraints impose a limit on after-market engine tuning modifications (though many tuners and users may exceed the official torque limits notwithstanding); (Later variants have been fitted to more powerful cars, such as the 300 bhp/350 Nm VW R36 and the 272 bhp/350 Nm Audi TTS.)
Heavier than a comparable Getrag conventional manual transmission ( vs. );

Applications

Volkswagen Group vehicles with the DSG gearbox include:

Audi
After originally using the DSG moniker, Audi subsequently renamed their direct-shift gearbox to S tronic.
Audi TT
Audi A1
Audi A3
Audi S3
Audi A4 (B8)
Audi A4 (B9)
Audi S4 (B8)
Audi S5 (B8)
Audi A5
Audi A6
Audi S6 (C7)
Audi A7
Audi A8 (D4)
Audi Q2
Audi Q3
Audi Q5
Audi R8 facelift

Bugatti
Bugatti Veyron EB 16.4 (developed by Ricardo rather than Borg Warner)
Bugatti Chiron

Lamborghini
Lamborghini Huracan

SEAT
SEAT Ibiza
SEAT Arona
SEAT León
SEAT Altea
SEAT Toledo
SEAT Alhambra
SEAT Ateca
SEAT Tarraco

Škoda
Škoda Fabia
Škoda Kodiaq
Škoda Karoq (in Australia it replaced with 8-speed sourced from Aisin)
Škoda Kamiq (except China market)
Škoda Octavia
Škoda Rapid (2012)
Škoda Roomster
Škoda Superb  (MK2 & MK3)
Škoda Yeti
Škoda Scala
Škoda Kushaq
Škoda Slavia

Volkswagen 
Volkswagen Vento
Volkswagen Santana
Volkswagen Bora (China)
Volkswagen Polo (paired with 6-speed TC automatic in some markets) 
Volkswagen Virtus
Volkswagen Golf, GTI, GTD, GTE, TDI, R32, R
Volkswagen Jetta (TDI and GLI)
Volkswagen Eos
Volkswagen Touran
Volkswagen New Beetle
Volkswagen Lamando
Volkswagen Passat and Passat (NMS) (China & US first generation)
Volkswagen CC
Volkswagen Arteon (except US market)
Volkswagen Sharan
Volkswagen Viloran
Volkswagen Scirocco
Volkswagen T-Cross
Volkswagen T-Roc
Volkswagen Taigun
Volkswagen Taos (China FWD & US AWD)
Volkswagen Tayron
Volkswagen Tiguan (except US market)
Volkswagen Teramont (China)

Volkswagen Commercial Vehicles
Volkswagen Caddy car-derived van
Volkswagen Transporter (T5 & T6)

Problems and recalls of DSG-equipped vehicles
The 7-speed DQ200 and 6-speed DQ250 gearboxes sometimes suffer from power-loss (gear disengaging) due to short-circuiting of wires caused by a build-up of sulphur in the transmission oil.

United States
In August 2009, Volkswagen of America issued two recalls of DSG-equipped vehicles. The first involved 13,500 vehicles, and was to address unplanned shifts to the neutral gear, while the second involved similar problems (by then attributed to faulty temperature sensors) and applied to 53,300 vehicles. These recalls arose as a result of investigations carried out by the US National Highway Traffic Safety Administration (NHTSA), where owners reported to the NHTSA a loss of power whilst driving. This investigation preliminary found only 2008 and 2009 model year vehicles as being affected.

Australia
In November 2009, Volkswagen recalled certain Golf, Jetta, EOS, Passat & Caddy models equipped with 6-speed DQ250 DSG transmission because the gearbox may read the clutch temperature incorrectly, which leads to clutch protection mode, causing a loss of power.

China
Since 2009 there have been widespread concerns from Chinese consumers particularly among the online community, who expressed that Volkswagen has failed to respond to complaints about defects in its DSG-equipped vehicles. Typical issues associated with 6-speed DSG include abnormal noise and inability to change gear; while issues associated with 7-speed DSG include abnormal noise, excessive shift shock, abnormal increase in engine RPM, flashing gear indicator on the dashboard as well as inability to shift to even-numbered gears. In March 2012 China's quality watchdog the General Administration of Quality Supervision, Inspection and Quarantine (AQSIQ) said that it had been in contact with Volkswagen (China) and urged the carmaker to probe the issues. In a survey held by Gasgoo.com (China) of 2,937 industry experts and insiders, 83% of respondents believed that the carmaker should consider a full vehicle recall. In March 2012 Volkswagen Group China admitted that there could be an issue in its seven-speed DSG gearboxes that may affect approximately 500,000 vehicles from its various subsidiaries in China. A software upgrade has since been offered for the affected vehicles in an attempt to repair the problem.

According to 163.com - one of China's most popular web portals - in March 2012 about a quarter of the complaints about problems found in cars in China's automotive market were made against DSG-equipped vehicles manufactured by Volkswagen. The top five models that dominate those complaints were:
 Volkswagen Magotan - 6%
 Volkswagen Bora - 5.3%
 Volkswagen Sagitar - 5.3%
 Volkswagen Touareg - 4.7%
 Volkswagen Golf - 4%

Would be worth noting that Touareg has never been fitted with a DSG transmission.

On 15 March 2013, China Central Television aired a program for the World Consumer Rights Day. The program criticized the issue associated with DSG-equipped vehicles manufactured by Volkswagen. On 17 March 2013 Volkswagen Group China announced on its official Weibo that it will voluntarily recall vehicles equipped with DSG boxes. Some sources have estimated the failure rate of DSG-equipped vehicles sold in China to be greater than 20,000 per million sold.

Sweden
VW Sweden stopped selling the Passat EcoFuel DSG as a taxi after many cars had problems with the 7 speed DSG gearbox. They instead offered the Touran EcoFuel DSG, which uses an updated version of the same DSG gearbox.

Japan
The recall has been extended to Japan with 91,000 (VW and Audi using the same DSG) being recalled.

Malaysia
13 days after the Singapore recall, Volkswagen Malaysia also announced a recall for the 7-speed DSG. No official statement was released by the company, but it was stated that a total of 3,962 were involved in the unit recall exercise - units produced between June 2010 and June 2011, with affected vehicles being Golf, Polo, Scirocco, Cross Touran, Passat and Jetta models equipped with the transmission.

Australian recall
15 October 2019, Australia recall of DSG 7-speed gearboxes.
Due to a production fault, over time a crack in the transmissions pressure accumulator can occur.
If the pressure accumulator cracks, oil and pressure is lost in the hydraulic system of the gearbox. As a result, the transmission of engine power via the gearbox is interrupted. The experience of this symptom would be comparable to depressing the clutch in a vehicle fitted with a manual transmission. This could increase the likelihood of an accident affecting the occupants of the vehicle and other road users.

See also
List of ZF transmissions
List of Aisin transmissions
List of GM transmissions
List of Ford transmissions
Automated manual transmission

References

External links
 Dual Clutch Transmission - DCT Facts (not implemented yet)

Official links
Volkswagen AG corporate website

Independent links
Pictures and diagrams of DQ250 DSG at WorldCarFans.com.
Reviews, videos, and explanation of DSG transmission
First Drive: Audi TT 3.2 DSG review at VWvortex.com.
European interest in dual clutch technology shifts up a gear, an informative article from Just-Auto.com.
Computer-controlled Meccano model of a DSG Transmission by Alan Wenbourne of the South East London Meccano Club (SELMEC).
Video of Alan Wenbourne's Meccano DSG in operation at YouTube.com.

Dual-clutch transmissions
Borg-Warner transmissions
Volkswagen Group